Caroline Springs is a suburb in Melbourne, Victoria, Australia,  west of Melbourne's Central Business District, located within the City of Melton local government area. Caroline Springs recorded a population of 24,488 at the 2021 census.

Caroline Springs has been developed on greenfield land since 1999 by Delfin, in partnership with the original landowners. Centrally located, just north of Kororoit Creek, is the town square and main shopping centre, known as CS Square, and a man-made lake known as Lake Caroline.

At the time of development, it was one of Melbourne's fastest growing suburbs and Delfin anticipated the population to be in excess of 25,000 people by 2015.

The Caroline Springs Post Office opened on 8 August 2005.

Developments

A$40 million five-star hotel owned by the Mercure Hotels group opened in August 2009. A new hotel and entertainment complex named WestWaters on the edge of Lake Caroline is now open.

On 4 April 2019, construction on the extension of CS Square was officially opened. The expansion made way for a new Woolworths supermarket, multiple new retail stores and an expanded car park.

Flora and fauna

Kororoit Creek runs through the centre of the suburb. The creek has been home to healthy populations of native animals for thousands of years, including the Tiger snake, the Eastern Blue-tongued Lizard, the Common snakeneck turtle, the Eastern brown snake and Kangaroos. Unfortunately due to development over the past 15 years, these species are now rarely seen in the area.

Due to development of large lakes and wetlands, species of frogs have reclaimed the area. The Common Eastern Froglet, the Eastern Banjo Frog and even the now endangered Growling Grass Frog have been seen and heard in the new lakes, wetlands and in Kororoit Creek. Many species of birds are also returning to the creeks and lakes. There are also a few kangaroos, several located in the endangered grassland bordered by Holland Way and College Street. These can usually be seen from the steel board walk or 4m viewing platform.

It is expected that the Kororoit Creek Trail will eventually be linked up to Caroline Springs providing cyclists with an off-road path all the way to Sunshine and onto the Melbourne CBD.

Transport

The suburb's main form of transport is the car and is a largely car-dependent community. It was planned under the concepts of street hierarchy and has just one main arterial, Caroline Springs Boulevard, which feeds into both the Deer Park Bypass and the Western Highway in the south and connects to Melbourne via either the Western Ring Road or the Princes Highway.

Caroline Springs railway station was one of a number of new train stations proposed under the 2008 Victorian Transport Plan. The station opened in January 2017.

Sport

Caroline Springs is currently represented in a number of local and regional sports.

Caroline Springs Hockey Club is one of the newest members in the local sports community. Founded in 2016, "The Springers" compete in the Hockey Victoria Pennant and Metro competitions.

References

External links
Caroline Springs Residents Association

Suburbs of Melbourne
Suburbs of the City of Melton
Populated places established in 1999
1999 establishments in Australia